The Beichle is a mountain of the Emmental Alps, overlooking Escholzmatt in the canton of Lucerne.

References

External links
 Beichle on Hikr

Mountains of the Alps
Mountains of the canton of Lucerne
Emmental Alps
One-thousanders of Switzerland
Mountains of Switzerland